The Hubei–Henan–Shaanxi Soviet (鄂豫陕苏维埃, E-Yu-Shan Suweiai) was a communist controlled region in north-central China in the mid-1930s, a constituent part of the Chinese Soviet Republic, a self-declared (unrecognised) sovereign state.

The Soviet or revolutionary Base Area was located in the mountainous tri-provincial border region from which it gets its designation, occupying contiguous counties which are now in the municipal regions of Shiyan (十堰市), HuB, Sanmenxia (三门峡) and Nanyang (南阳), HeN, and Shangluo and Ankang, Shaanxi.

Military Conflict before the Second Sino-Japanese War
In 1935, the Base Area was the object of two Nationalist Government Encirclement Campaigns in 1935, both of which failed. 
Uniquely in the history of these campaigns, the target Soviet was then let be: its forces and apparatus were neither destroyed nor driven out by subsequent strategy. This may be due to the Long March then concluding, which made much of Shaanxi into a fairly secure, Soviet Union-backed territory for the Chinese Communists.

References

External links 

Chinese Soviet Republic
Former socialist republics